Choking, also known as foreign body airway obstruction (FBAO), is a phenomenon that occurs when breathing is impeded by a blockage inside of the respiratory tract. An obstruction that prevents oxygen from entering the lungs results in oxygen deprivation. Although oxygen stored in the blood and lungs can keep a person alive for several minutes after breathing stops, choking often leads to death.

Over 4,000 choking-related deaths occur in the United States every year. Deaths from choking most often occur in the very young (children under 2 years old) and in the elderly (adults over 75 years). Foods that can adapt their shape to that of the pharynx (such as bananas, marshmallows, or gelatinous candies) are more dangerous. Various forms of first aid are used to address resolve choking.

Choking is the fourth leading cause of unintentional injury death in the United States. Many episodes go unreported because they are brief and resolve without needing medical attention. Of the reported events, 80% occur in children younger than 15 years, and 20% occur in children older than 15 years. Choking on a foreign object resulted in 162,000 deaths (2.5 per 100,000) in 2013, compared with 140,000 deaths (2.9 per 100,000) in 1990.

Signs and symptoms
Choking victims may present very subtly, especially in the setting of long term foreign body aspiration. Cough seen in 80% of foreign body aspiration cases, and shortness of breath is seen in 25%. People may be unable to speak, attempt to use hand signals to indicate they are choking, attempt to force vomiting, or clutch at their throat.

Respiratory 
Respiratory symptoms can include involuntary cough, gurgling, shortness of breath, labored breathing, or wheezing. Loss of consciousness may occur if breathing is not restored. In the setting of lower airway aspiration, patients may have pneumonia like symptoms such as fever, chest pain, foul smelling sputum, or blood in sputum (hemoptysis). In the case of long term foreign body aspiration, patients may present with signs of lobar pneumonia or pleural effusion.

The time a choking victim is still alive without brain damage can vary, but typically brain damage can occur when the patient remains without air for approximately three minutes (it is variable). Death can occur if breathing is not restored in six to ten minutes (varies depending on the person). However, life can be extended by using cardiopulmonary resuscitation for unconscious victims of choking (see more details further below).

Skin 
The face turning blue (cyanosis) from lack of oxygen if breathing is not restored. Cyanosis may also be seen on the fingertips.

Causes

Choking occurs when a foreign body blocks the airway. This obstruction can be located in the pharynx, the larynx, trachea, or lower respiratory tract. The blockage can be either partial (insufficient air passes through to the lungs) or complete (complete blockage of airflow).

Foods that are small, round, or hard pose a high risk of choking. Examples include hard candy, chunks of cheese or hot dogs, nuts, grapes, marshmallows, and popcorn.

Among children, the most common causes of choking are food, coins, toys, and balloons. In one study, peanuts were the most common object found in the airway of children evaluated for suspected foreign body aspiration. Small, round non-food objects such as balls, marbles, toys, and toy parts are also associated with a high risk of choking death because of the potential to completely block a child's airway. Children younger than age three are especially at risk of choking due to lack of fully developed chewing habits, and the tendency to insert object in their mouth as they explore the environment. Because a child's airway is smaller in diameter than that of an adult's, smaller objects can more often cause airway obstruction in children. Additionally, infants and young children generate a less forceful cough than adults, so coughing may not be as effective in relieving airway obstruction.

Risk factors of foreign body airway obstruction for people of any age include the use of alcohol or sedatives, procedures involving the oral cavity or pharynx, oral appliances, or medical conditions that cause difficulty swallowing or impair the cough reflex. Conditions that can cause difficulty swallowing and/or impaired coughing include neurological conditions such as stroke, Alzheimer's disease, or Parkinson's disease. In older adults, risk factors also include living alone, wearing dentures, and having difficulty swallowing. Children and adults with neurological, cognitive, or psychiatric disorders are at an increased risk of choking and may experience a delay in diagnosis because there may not be a known history of a foreign body entering the airway.

Choking on food is only one type of airway obstruction; others include blockage due to tumors, swelling and inflammation of the airway tissues from organic foreign bodies, and compression of the laryngopharynx, larynx, or vertebrate trachea in strangulation. Foreign bodies can also enter the reparatory tract through the chest wall, such as in the setting of a gunshot injury.

Diagnosis 
Recognition and diagnosis of choking involves recognition of the signs and symptoms like coughing and wheezing (see Signs and Symptoms).  

Choking can indicate a full obstruction of the airway and can prompt further action from anyone witnessing a choking episode. For choking episodes that require emergent evaluation by a doctor, several other tools can be used by diagnosis.

Imaging and Visualization Methods 
Bronchoscopy

Imaging modalities in the healthcare setting each have their advantages and drawbacks. According to the American Heart Association, bronchoscopy is a reliable method used to visualize the cause of choking when not resolved via oxygen and supportive care. Prior to bronchoscopy, an invasive procedure, other imaging modalities may be used.

X-ray

An X-ray uses high-frequency electromagnetic radiation to visualize the human body including the lungs via chest X-ray. Many objects do not show up on X-ray (radiolucent). About 10% objects are radio-opaque like and can be visualized using X-ray. X-rays are more accessible than other imaging modalities but expose a person to radiation. In cases where X-ray is inconclusive, fluoroscopy may be able to demonstrate radiolucent or smaller foreign bodies. Chest fluoroscopy is a real-time X-ray image (sometimes referred to as an X-ray movie) to view breathing and coughing.

Computerized Tomography (CT)

A CT scan uses a tube with multiple X-ray machines to build a 3D image from 2D X-ray images from multiple cross-sections. Radiolucent objects can be better captured on CT than X-ray. Since a CT is multiple X-rays, the exposure to radiation is significantly greater.

Magnetic Resonance Imaging (MRI)

An MRI scan uses radio-frequency pulse under a magnetic field to create a high-resolution image of the body. MRIs can detect foreign bodies with higher accuracy than X-ray or CT. MRI does not expose the person to radiation. Drawbacks of MRI include claustrophobia and high cost. For children, sedation may be required to undergo MRI imaging.

Treatment
Airway management is used to restore a person's ventilation which consists of severity assessment, procedural planning, and may consist of multiple treatment modalities to restore airway.

Treatments will vary based on severity and stage of airway blockage. In basic airway management, treatment generally consists of anti-choking first aid techniques, such as the heimlich maneuver. In advanced airway management, complex methods are used.

Basic Treatment (First Aid) 
Basic treatment of choking includes several non-invasive techniques to help remove foreign bodies from the airways.

General Strategy: "Five and Five" 
For a conscious choking victim, most institutions such as the American Heart Association and the American Red Cross, recommend the same general protocol of first-aid: encouraging the victim to cough, followed by hard back slaps. If these attempts are not effective, abdominal thrusts (the Heimlich maneuver) or chest thrusts (if the victim cannot receive abdominal pressure) are used. There are additional procedures available for victims who cannot receive pressure to the abdomen such as babies or people with disabilities (discussed in detail further below).

If none of these techniques are effective, protocol by various institutions recommend alternating series of back slaps and series of thrusts (these on the abdomen or chest, depending on the victim), 5 times of each technique and repeat ("five and five").

Scenarios in which the general first aid procedures are not resolving the choking, involvement of emergency medical services is crucial and administration of first aid should be continued until emergency services arrive.

Choking can change the colour in the victim's faces due to lack of oxygen, which puts them at risk for loss of consciousness and falling to the ground. It is recommended to avoid panic and begin appropriate resuscitation techniques.

Each one of the techniques in the first aid protocol against choking are detailed below:

Cough 
If the choking victim is conscious and can cough, the American Red Cross and the Mayo Clinic recommend encouraging them to stay calm and continue coughing freely . Between coughs, it may be easier to take air through the nose to refill the lungs.

Back Blows (Back Slaps) 

Many associations, including the American Red Cross and the Mayo Clinic, recommend the use of back blows (back slaps) to aid a choking victim. This technique is performed by bending the choking victim forward as much as possible, even trying to place their head lower than the chest, to avoid the blows driving the object deeper into the person's throat (a rare complication, but possible). The bending is in the back, while the neck should not be excessively bent. It is convenient that one hand supports the victim's chest. Then the back blows are performed by delivering forceful slaps with the heel of the hand on the victim's back, between the shoulder blades.

The back slaps push behind the blockage to expel the foreign object out. In some cases, the physical vibration of the action may cause enough movement to clear the airway.

Abdominal Thrusts (Heimlich Maneuver) 

Abdominal thrusts are performed with the rescuer embracing the belly of the choking victim from behind. Then, the rescuer closes the own dominant hand, grasps it with the other hand, and presses forcefully with them on the area located between the chest and the belly button of the victim, in a direction of in-and-up. This method tries to create enough pressure upwards to expel the object that obstructs the airway. The strength is not focused directly against the ribs, to avoid breaking them. If the first thrust does not solve the choking, it can be repeated several times.

The use of abdominal thrusts is not recommended for infants under 1 year of age due to risk of causing injury, so there are adaptations for babies (see more details further below), but a child that is too big for the babies' adaptations would require normal abdominal thrusts (according to the size of the body). Besides, abdominal thrusts should not be used when the victim's abdomen presents problems to receive them, such as pregnancy or excessive size; in these cases, chest thrusts are advised (see more details further below).

In the case of choking alone, abdominal thrusts are one of the possibilities that can be tried on oneself (see more details further below).

The purpose of abdominal thrusts is to create enough pressure to expel the object lodged upwards in the airway, relieving the obstruction. The abdominal thrusts method was discovered by doctor Henry Heimlich in 1974. Heimlich claimed that his maneuver was better than back blows, arguing that back blows could cause the obstruction to become more deeply lodged in the victim's airway. That started a debate into the medical community, that ended up with the recommendation of alternating both techniques, but, to prevent the complications, the back blows would be performed making the patients to bend the back and supporting their chest. In addition, the patient's chest would be supported during the back slaps.

Although it is a well known method for choking intervention, the Heimlich Maneuver is backed by limited evidence and unclear guidelines. The use of the maneuver has saved many lives but can produce deleterious consequences if not performed correctly. This includes rib fracture, perforation of the jejunum, diaphragmatic herniation, among others.

Chest Thrusts 
When abdominal thrusts cannot be performed on the victim (serious injuries, pregnancy, or belly size that is too large for the rescuer to effectively perform abdominal thrust technique), chest thrusts are advised instead.

Chest thrusts are performed with the rescuer embracing the chest of the choking victim from behind. Then, the rescuer closes the own dominant hand and grasps it with the other hand. This can produce several kinds of fists, but any of them can be valid if they can be placed on the victim's chest without sinking a knuckle too painfully. Keeping the fist with both hands, the rescuer uses it to press forcefully inwards on the lower half of the chest bone (sternum). The pressure is not focused on the very endpoint (named xiphoid process) to avoid breaking it. When the victim is a woman, the zone of the pressure of the chest thrusts would normally be above the level of the breasts. If the first thrust does not solve the choking, it can be repeated several times.

Anti-Choking Devices 
Since 2015, several anti-choking devices were developed and released to the market. They are based on a mechanical vacuum effect, without a power source. Most use an attached mask to make a vacuum from the patient's nose and mouth. The current models of anti-choking devices are quite similar: a direct plunger tool (LifeVac), and a vacuum syringe (backward syringe) that also keeps the tongue in place by inserting a tube in the mouth (Dechoker). Both of them have received certification, and they have been reported to be effective in real cases. Other mechanical models are in development, such as Lifewand, which creates a vacuum by direct pressure against the patient's face.

A 2020 systematic review of the effectiveness of the three devices listed discovered "a more detailed review of the studies demonstrated a very low certainty of evidence for its use", and concluded that "there are many weaknesses in the available data and few unbiased trials that test the effectiveness of anti-choking suction devices resulting in insufficient evidence to support or discourage their use. Practitioners should continue to adhere to guidelines authored by local resuscitation authorities which align with ILCOR recommendations."

Unconscious Victims 
A choking victim who becomes unconscious must be gently caught before falling and placed lying on a surface. That surface should be firm enough (it is recommended placing a layer of something on the floor and laying the victim above). Emergency medical services must be called, if this has not already been done.

While waiting for emergency services to arrive, the unconscious choking victim should receive a cardiopulmonary resuscitation (CPR) for choking victims, which is quite similar to the CPR for any other non-breathing patient. Infants less than one year old require a special adaptation for unconscious babies of that CPR (described further below).

The anti-choking CPR for unconscious adults or children, but not infants, is a cycle that alternates series of compressions with series of ventilations (rescue breaths). In that CPR:

Each round of compressions applies 30 compressions on the lower half of the chest bone (sternum), at an approximate rhythm of nearly 2 per second. After that series, the rescuer looks for the obstructing object and, if it is visible, the rescuer makes a try to extract it, usually by using a finger sweeping. There are no compressions during this step, but, if the removal complicates and takes a lot of time, it may require to repeat compressions at some moments, obviously without causing hindrances to the extraction. The object can be found and removed in this step or not, but this CPR procedure must continue anyway, until the victims can breathe by themselves or emergency medical services arrive. Next, the rescuer applies a rescue breath, pinching the victim's nose and puffing air inside of the mouth. It is recommended, additionally, tilting the victim's head up and down, to reposition it trying to open an entrance for the air, and then give an additional rescue breath. The rescue breaths would usually fail while the object is still inside stopping them, but then the rescuer has only to continue with the next step. Anyway, they can be successful, and then the chest of the victim would rise. When a rescue breath reaches the lungs, it happens because the object has been moved to an unknown position that leaves some open space, so it can be useful making the next rescue breaths more softly to avoid moving the object to a new blocking position again, and, in case of the soft rescue breaths are not successful, increasing the strength of blowing in the next ones. The colour of the victim's face would improve after several rescue breaths have been successful. After the rescue breaths, this resuscitation returns to the 30 initial compressions, in a cycle that repeats continually, until the victims can breathe by themselves.

An anti-choking device can unblock the airway on unconscious victims, but does not necessarily remove the obstructing object from the mouth, which may need a manual removal. The victim will then require a normal cardiopulmonary resuscitation (CPR), in the manner that has been described above but only alternating the 30 compressions and the two rescue breaths.

Finger Sweeping 
It is crucial to avoid blindingly sweeping the airway unless there is direct visualization of the airway – in fact, these procedures are advised only to be performed in more controlled environments such as an operating room. In unconscious choking victims, the American Medical Association has previously advocated sweeping the fingers across the back of the throat to attempt to dislodge airway obstructions. Many modern protocols suggest other treatment modalities are superior. Red Cross procedures also advise rescuers not to perform a finger sweep unless an object can be clearly seen in the victim's mouth to prevent driving the obstruction deeper into the victim's airway. Other protocols suggest that if the patient is conscious they will be able to remove the foreign object themselves, or if they are unconscious, the rescuer should place them in the recovery position to allow the drainage of fluids out of the mouth instead of down the trachea due to gravity. There is also a risk of causing further damage (inducing vomiting, for instance) by using a finger sweep technique. There are no studies that have examined the usefulness of the finger sweep technique when there is no visible object in the airway. Recommendations for the use of the finger sweep have been based on anecdotal evidence.

Particular cases

Infants 
The majority of choking injuries and fatalities occurs in children aged 0–4, highlighting the importance for widespread dissemination of the appropriate anti-choking techniques for these age groups. In fact, it has been shown that increased parental education may decrease choking rates among children.

For infants under 1 years old, the American Heart Association recommends adapted procedures. The size of the children's body is the most important aspect in determining the correct anti-choking technique. Children who are too large for the babies' procedures require the normal first aid techniques against choking.

First aid for infants alternates a special cycle of back blows (five back slaps) followed by chest thrusts (five adapted chest compressions). In the back blows maneuver, the rescuer slaps on the baby's back. It is recommended that the baby receive them being slightly leaned upside-down on an inclination. There exist several ways to achieve this:

One modality is that the rescuer sits down on a seat with the baby, and supports the baby with a forearm and its respective hand. The baby's head must be carefully held with that hand, usually by the jaw. Then the baby's body can be leaned forward upside-down along the rescuer's thighs and receive the slaps.

As an easier alternative, the rescuer can sit on a bed or sofa, or even the floor, carrying the baby. Next, the rescuer should support the baby's body on the own lap, to lean the baby upside-down at the right or the left of the lap. Then the slaps would be applied on the back of the baby.

If the rescuer cannot sit down, at least it is possible to attempt the maneuver at a low height and over a soft surface. Then the rescuer would support the baby with a forearm and the hand of that side, holding the baby's head with that hand, usually by the jaw. The baby's body would be leaned upside-down in that position to receive the slaps.

In the chest thrusts maneuver, the baby's body is placed lying on a surface. Then the rescuer does the compressions on the chest bone (sternum), pressing with only two fingers on its lower half (the nearest to the abdomen). Abdominal thrusts are not recommended in children less than one year old because they can cause liver damage.

The back blows and chest thrusts are alternated in cycles of five back blows and five chest compressions until the object comes out of the infant's airway or until the infant becomes unconscious.

Is choking is unresolved despite rescue attempt, it is vital that somebody calls to the emergency medical services and continue first aid until they arrive.

Unconscious Infants 
If the infant becomes unconscious, emergency medical services must be called (if this has not been done yet). Until emergency services arrives the American Heart Association recommends starting an anti-choking cardiopulmonary resuscitation (CPR) adaptive to infants. In this procedure, the baby is placed face-up on a firm and horizontal surface (the floor can be used). The baby's head must be in a straight position, looking frontally, because tilting too much a baby's head backward can close the access to the trachea. Then, it is applied a cycle of resuscitation that alternates compressions and rescue breaths, like in a normal CPR, but with some differences:

The rescuer makes 30 compressions with only two fingers in the lower half of the chest bone (sternum), at an approximate rhythm of nearly 2 per second. At the end of the round of compressions, the rescuer looks into the mouth for the obstructing object. And, if it is visible, the rescuer makes a try to extract it (mainly using a finger sweep). If the removal complicates and takes too much time, it may require to repeat compressions at some moments, without hindering to the extraction. A rescuer that already knows that the choking object is a bag (or similar) does not need to see the object before trying to extract it (because there is no risk of sinking it much deeper, and it is easy to detect by using the touch carefully). Being any object extracted or not, this CPR procedure must continue until the babies can breathe by themselves or emergency medical services arrive. Next, the rescuer makes a rescue breath, covering the baby's mouth and nose simultaneously with the own mouth, and blowing air inside. After that first rescue breath, it is recommended tilting the baby's head up and down (but leaving it approximately straight again), trying to open a space for the air in that manner, and then give an additional rescue breath. The rescue breaths usually fail while the object is still blocking, but then the rescuer has only to continue with the next step. Anyway, they can be successful, and then the chest of the baby would be seen rising. If a rescue breath reaches the baby's lungs, it is because the object has been moved to an unknown position that leaves some open space, so it can be useful making the next rescue breaths more softly to avoid moving the object to a new blocking position again, and, in case of those soft rescue breaths are not successful, increasing the strength of blowing in the next ones. But it must be noted that the bodies of the babies are delicate, and, when the airway is not clogged, only a little strength in blowing is enough to fill their lungs. The baby's colour would improve after some successful rescue breaths. After the rescue breaths, the rescuer has to return to the 30 initial compressions, repeating the same resuscitation cycle again, continually, until the choking babies can breathe normally by themselves.

Patients who are Pregnant or have Obesity 
Some choking victims cannot receive pressure on their bellies. The American Heart Associated recommends substituting the abdominal thrusts for chest thrusts.

These victims can include: patients with serious injuries in the abdomen, pregnant women, and obese patients. However, in the case of the obese victims, if the rescuer is capable enough to effectively wrap their arms around the circumference of the victim's abdomen, it is possible to apply the normal first aid against choking, with abdominal thrusts (see details further above).

Chest thrusts are performed in a similar way to the abdominal thrusts, but with the fist placed on the lower half of the chest bone (sternum), rather than over the middle of the abdomen. As a reference, in women, the zone of pressure of the chest thrusts would be normally higher than the breasts. It is convenient to avoid placing the knuckles too painfully. Finally, strong inward thrusts are then applied.

The rest of the first aid protocol is the same, starting with asking the victim to cough freely, and then, if the victim cannot cough, the series of chest thrust are alternated with series of slaps on the back. Those back slaps are applied normally: bending forward the back of the victims and supporting their chest with one hand.

If choking remains unresolved, calling emergency medical services is vital and first aid should be continued until they arrive.

In Wheelchair 
If the choking victim is a person in a wheelchair, the procedure is similar than in the case of the other victims. The difference is in trying to apply the techniques directly, while the victim is seated on the wheelchair.

Coughing should be encouraged first before applying the techniques. When the victim cannot cough, it is recommended alternating series of back blows and thrusts, as in other cases.

Back blows (back slaps) can be used after bending forward the back of the victim very much, and supporting the victim's chest with the other hand.

Abdominal and chest thrusts can also be used. To perform the abdominal thrusts, the rescuer must get behind the wheelchair. Then the rescuer can embrace the victim's abdomen from behind and above, leaning over the top of the wheelchair's backrest. If this is too difficult, the rescuer can get down and embrace from behind the victim's abdomen and the wheelchair's backrest all together. In narrow spaces that can not be opened, the position can be achieved by turning the victim to one side. Finally, the rescuer would grasp the own hand with the other, and place them between the chest and the belly button of the victim, and apply sudden pressures with them on that zone, in a direction of in-and-up. If the victim cannot receive abdominal thrusts (in cases as having serious injuries in the belly, pregnancy, and others), chest thrusts must be used instead. They are applied while the victim is in the wheelchair too, but making sudden inward pressures on the lower half of the breast bone (sternum). If the space is too narrow and impossible to widen, the abdominal or chest thrusts can be tried by turning the victim to one side.

An alternance of back slaps and thrusts series is used until the choking is solved, as in other victims.

If choking remains unresolved, calling emergency medical services is vital and first aid should be continued until they arrive.

If a victim of choking in wheelchair becomes unconscious, it is required an anti-chocking cardiopulmonary resuscitation (CPR), that it is exactly the same one than in the case of non-disabled victims of choking. Anyway, it can be noted that the victim needs to be taken from the wheelchair to be placed lying face-up on an appropriated surface (not too hard or too soft, and it is possible to put a layer of something between the floor and the victim). While they arrive, the rescuer has to apply the anti-choking cardiopulmonary resuscitation for unconscious victims (see details further above).

As a preventive measure, it is convenient to avoid placing patients with disabilities in a narrow and encased spaces at mealtimes, as more open spaces allow easier access for rescuers. Besides, placing an anti-choking device nearby is a common safety measure in environments.

Bedridden Patient 
If the choking victim is lying in bed, but is conscious and unable to sit up (such as in patients with disabilities or injuries), the first aid would be the same, but performed by sitting the patient on the edge of the bed.

Before adjusting the patient's position, the rescuer tries that the victim coughs freely and with strength. The victim would do it better by turning to one of their sides. When coughing is too difficult or impossible, the rescuer would sit the victim on the bed's edge, to make coughing easier or to apply the anti-choking maneuvers (these are required if the victim cannot cough).

This can be achieved grasping the victim by the legs (behind of the knees, or by the calves or ankles) and rotating them until they are out of the bed. Next, the rescuer would sit the victim up on the edge, pulling the shoulders or arms (in the forearms or wrists). Then it is possible to apply the anti-choking maneuvers from behind: series of back slaps (after bending very much the back of the victim, and supporting the chest with one hand) and series of abdominal thrusts (sudden compressions on the part of the victim's belly that is between the chest and the belly button, in a direction of in-and-up). When the victim cannot receive abdominal thrusts (in cases as having serious injuries in the belly, pregnancy, and others), they must be changed for chest thrusts (sudden inward pressures on the lower half of the breast bone).

When a rescuer cannot sit the victim up, it is possible to perform chest or abdominal thrusts frontally while the victim is lying on the bed (despite they would be less effective in that horizontal position). They are made by putting one hand on the top of the other and making with both of them strong pressures downwards on the lower half of the breast bone (the sternum), or in a downward-and-frontward direction between the chest and the belly button.

If choking remains unresolved, calling emergency medical services is vital and first aid should be continued until they arrive.

When the victims of choking in bed become unconscious, they need the same anti-choking cardiopulmonary resuscitation procedure that is employed for other unconscious choking victims (see details further above).

Preventively, it is important to know that eating while laying in bed increases the risk of choking. When a person with a disability or injury is present, a common measure of prevention is placing an anti-choking device at reach.

On the Floor, Victim with Disability or Injury 
It is possible, though rare, that a choking victim would be laying on the floor but conscious. For example, someone having a disability that makes impossible to sit up and to keep standing up on the feet. If this is the case, the first aid is the same, but after sitting the victim on the floor.

Before adjusting the patient's position, the rescuer asks the victim to cough freely and with strength. The victim would cough better by turning to a side. If coughing is too difficult or impossible, the rescuer would sit the victim up, to make it easier or to apply anti-choking maneuvers (these are needed when the victim cannot cough).

A rescuer would sit the victim up by pulling the shoulders or arms (in the forearms or wrists). When the victim is sitting up, the rescuer can sit behind to apply the anti-choking maneuvers: back slaps (after bending very much the back of the victim, and supporting the chest with one hand) and abdominal thrusts (sudden compressions in a direction of in-and-up, on the part of the victim's belly that is between the chest and the belly button). When victims cannot receive abdominal thrusts properly (as the seriously injured in the belly, and the pregnant women), you need to change them for chest thrusts (sudden pressures inward on the lower half of the breast bone).

In some situations it is impossible to sit the victim up, and then the rescuer can try one of the thrusts techniques frontally on the laying victim (despite it would make them to lose effectivity). Anyway, they can be made by putting one hand on the top of the other and using them to make strong pressures downwards on the lower half of the breast bone (the sternum), or downwards-and-frontwards on the abdomen (between the chest and the belly button).

If choking remains unresolved, calling emergency medical services is vital and first aid should be continued until they arrive.

If the victim is unconscious, it is needed the same anti-choking cardiopulmonary resuscitation procedure that is used in other unconscious choking victims (see details further above).

In the prevention of choking, it can be remembered the practice of placing an anti-choking device around people with disabilities.

Seizing Victim 
Seizing can occur for a multitude of reasons but is common in those diagnosed with epilepsy. During a seizure, victims may experience strangulation or throat constriction during consciousness. The victim will not have control of their bodily functions and will need someone to create a safe area for them. One should clear a space where the victim can lay down and remove or loosen anything that is around their neck. Then one should turn them on their side as to help them breathe and to avoid potential choking on the saliva.

Self-Treatment 

First aid anti-choking techniques can be applied on oneself if others are not around to perform general first aid. This can include carrying an approved anti-choking device nearby (see above) or conducting first aid techniques on oneself, mainly by hand:

The most widely recommended maneuver consists of positioning ones own abdomen over the border of an object: usually a chairback, but it could work on an armchair, railing or countertop, and then driving the abdomen upon the border, making sharp thrusts in an inwards-an-upwards direction. It is possible to place a fist or both fists between the chosen border and the belly, to increase the pressure of the maneuver and make it easier (depending on the situation). It is also possible trying to fall on the edge, aiming to achieve more pressure in that way. Other variation of this consists in pressing one's own belly with an appropriated object, in an inwards-and-upwards direction.

Additionally, abdominal thrusts can be self-applied only with the hands. This is achieved by making a fist, grasping it with the other hand, and placing them on the area located between the chest and the belly button. Then the body is bent forward and the hands make strong compressions pressing in an inwards-an-upwards direction. One study concluded that the self-administered abdominal thrusts were as effective as those performed by another person.

When certain scenarios make it impossible for self treatment with abdominal thrust (serious injuries, pregnancy, or obesity), the self application of chest thrusts are recommended, although more difficult. This would be achieved by leaning the body forward, making a fist, grasping it with the other hand, and doing strong compressions inwards with both of them on the lower half of the chest bone (sternum). It is convenient to relax the chest for a better reception. Other variation of this is the use of an appropriated object to press inwards in the same point, being equally convenient to receive the compressions when the chest is relaxed.
Making attempts to cough, when it is possible, can also aid in clearing the airway.

Alternatively, multiple sources of evidence suggest applying the head-down (inverse) position. is a promising self treatment. To perform this maneuver, put your hands on the floor and then place the knees on an upper seat (as on a bed, a sofa, or an armchair). Additional movements up or down can be attempted in this position.

Advanced Treatment 
There are many advanced medical treatments available to relieve choking or airway obstruction, including the removal of a foreign object with the help of a laryngoscope or bronchoscope. The use of any commercial approved anti-choking device, if it is available nearby, may be a more abrupt solution, but brief.

A cricothyrotomy may be performed as an emergency procedure when the stuck object cannot be removed. This is an intervention that involves severing a little opening in the patient's neck (between the thyroid cartilage and the cricoid cartilage, until reaching the trachea) and inserting there a tube to introduce air through it, bypassing the upper airways. Usually, this procedure is only performed by someone with knowledge about it and surgical skills, when the patient is already unconscious.

Prevention

Prevention for Babies and Children 
All young children require care in eating, and they must learn to chew their food completely to avoid choking. Feeding them while they are running, playing, laughing, etc. increases the risk of choking. Caregivers must supervise children while eating or playing. Pediatricians and dentists can provide information on various age groups to parents and caregivers about what food and toys are appropriate to prevent choking. The American Academy of Pediatricians recommends waiting until 6 months of age before introducing solid foods to infants. Caregivers should avoid giving children younger than 5 years old foods that pose a high risk of choking, such as hot dog pieces, bananas, cheese sticks, cheese chunks, hard candy, nuts, grapes, marshmallows, or popcorn. Later, when they are accustomed to these foods, it is recommended to serve them split into small pieces. Some foods as hot dogs, bananas, or grapes are usually split lengthwise, sliced, or both. Parents, teachers, and other caregivers for children are advised to be trained in choking first aid and cardiopulmonary resuscitation (CPR).

Children readily put small objects into their mouths (deflated balloons, marbles, small pieces, buttons, coins, button batteries, etc.), which can lead to choking. A complicated obstruction for babies is choking on deflated balloons (including preservatives) or plastic bags. This also includes the nappy sacks, used for wrapping the dirty diapers, which are sometimes dangerously placed near the babies. To prevent children from swallowing things, precautions should be taken in the environment to keep dangerous objects out of their reach. Small children must be supervised closely and taught to avoid putting things into their mouths. Toys and games may indicate on their packages the ages for which they are safe. In the US, children's toy and product manufacturers are required by law to apply appropriate warning labels to their packaging, but toys that are resold may not have them. Caregivers can try to prevent choking by considering the features of a toy (such as size, shape, consistency and small parts) before giving it to a child. Children's products that are found to pose a choking risk can be taken off the market.

Anticipatory Guidance from Pediatricians

As a part of well-visits, pediatricians provide education to parents and their children regarding their development. Included in these visits is anticipatory guidance, which provides advice to parents and children as primary prevention of disease and illness including choking. For example, for a child that is 7–9 months old, children start to develop a pincer grasp allowing them to reach for objects. The ability to place these objects in their mouths significantly increases choking risk.

Example anticipatory guidance for children 7–9 months old:

 Infants should avoid moving when feeding like riding in a car or stroller. Infants should be sitting upright and remain still. 
 Infants should be supervised when feeding including children younger than 3 years old 
 Infants will try to feed themselves. Avoid foods such as grapes, popcorn, carrots, nuts, and hard candies. Difficult to swallow foods like peanut butter and marshmallows should be given with caution.
 Specifically, toys like marbles, balls, balloons should not be given including children younger than 3 years old.
Regulations for Children in the United States

Several laws and commissions are aimed at preventing choking hazards in children. Formed in 1972, alongside the passing of the Consumer Products Safety Act, the U.S. Consumer Product Safety Commission (CPSC) regulates consumer projects that may pose "unreasonable risk" of injury to its users. The Consumer Products Safety Act allowed the CPSC to ban or place warnings on objects that could harm consumers. A Small Parts Test Fixture (SPTF) is a cylinder measuring 2.25 inches long by 1.25 inches wide determines whether a choking hazarding warning will be placed on the product. Furthermore, in 2008, the Consumer Product Safety Improvement requires any advertisements or websites regarding sale of a product to display choking hazard warnings.  

According to a 1991 study, warning labels are an effective preventive measure against choking accidents. Items that contain many parts may include pieces that are considered choking hazards. Labels on children's toys may state recommended age ranges, and other items may carry a warning to parents to keep them out of the reach of children. Warning labels are clearly placed and written, usually including an obvious image.

While products are protected, there are currently no Food and Drug Administration (FDA) regulations regarding food choking hazards.

Prevention for Other Groups at Risk
Some population groups have a higher choking risk, such as the elderly, persons with disabilities (physically or mentally), people under the effects of alcohol or drugs, people who have taken medications that reduce the ability to salivate or react, patients with difficulties in swallowing (dysphagia), suicidal individuals, people with epilepsy, and people on the autism spectrum. They may require more assistance to feed themselves, and it may be necessary to supervise them while they eat. People who are unable to chew properly should not be served hard food. In cases where a person is unable to safely eat, food can be given by feeding syringes. People who have taken any medication that reduces saliva should not eat solid food until their salivation is restored.

Notable cases

See also
 Basic airway management
 BLS
 Breathing
 Cerebral hypoxia
 Oxygen deprivation
 Pulmonary aspiration

References

External links 

 

Medical emergencies
Causes of death
First aid
Symptoms and signs: Respiratory system